Chaotic is an American-Canadian animated science fantasy television series produced by 4Kids Entertainment. It was animated by Canadian studio Bardel Entertainment for season 1 and South Korean studio Dong Woo Animation for season 2 and 3. It is based on the Danish trading card game of the same name, with most of the plot based on the original storyline of the Danish trading card game.

Premise 
Chaotic tells the tale of a teenage boy named Tom and his friend Kaz. They both play the Chaotic Trading Card/Online Game. Kaz always tries to tell Tom about a secret code to play for real which Tom refuses to believe. While playing online Tom receives the special password. When he enters the password into his game scanner he is transported to a place called Chaotic that is able to take him to another world where the characters, locations and items in the card game came to life.

There are two parts to the Chaotic world, Chaotic itself and Perim. Chaotic is where the people play an advanced version of the card/online game where they transform into the creatures. The games can be watched via monitor by other players.

The second part is Perim. In Perim the creatures, locations and items from the game are real. Players from the Chaotic game can teleport into Perim and scan the locations, creatures and items with their scanners, gaining the ability to use them in their game. There are four tribes in Perim. Two tribes, the Overworld and the Underworld, have been at war over a great power called the Cothica. Despite their names, there is no definite good and evil tribe, as both have different stories and interpretations of how the war began, with each tribe seeing the other as being evil. The Danians and Mipedians have since joined the war, turning it into a four-way conflict over the Cothica. It is said that the Mipedians were once united with the Overworlders and the Danians united with the Underworlders. It is still unknown why they separated.

Both Chaotic and Perim are made up of a mysterious code called the "Chaotic Code". The code is noted for constantly changing in random ways. Thus, it is considered "chaotic." In Perim, the Chaotic Code describes everything. It contains the information for all the creatures, BattleGear, attacks, Mugic, and locations. The Cothica, mentioned above, is the source of all the codes in Perim. The code also describes everything in Chaotic. The BattleDromes, Transporters, and CodeScanners can analyze and/or modify this code for matches, transport, or creation of virtual cards.

When the players are in Chaotic/Perim they exist simultaneously on Earth. When a Chaotic player leaves Chaotic they become one person again and the Earth version of the player gains the memories of anything they experienced in the Chaotic/Perim world. This is awkward the first time they transport, as their online deck is blocked so that their Chaotic self can use it and their scanner becomes non-functional, causing many people to believe they have broke their scanners until they are re-united with their Chaotic self.

Episodes

Characters 

 Tom Majors (a.k.a. MajorTom) – Mainly an OverWorld player, Tom Majors is the main protagonist of the series. He is subsequently shocked and overwhelmed by his first transportation to Chaotic, transforming into the Card Game Creatures and experiencing the battle "for real." However, Tom eventually overcomes his fear and is presented as a bold risk taker and thrill seeker, meeting the Creatures and exploring the locations in the dimensional world of Perim. Tom is honest, truthful and trustworthy and cares deeply for his friends. Even if his rarest and favorite cards are on the line. Tom's favorite and trademark card is Maxxor, the leader of Perim's Overworld. His name and username are a reference to Major Tom, the fictional astronaut from the David Bowie song, Space Oddity.
 Kazdan "Kaz" Kalinkas (a.k.a. KidChaor) – Mainly an UnderWorld player, Kaz focuses on the game, becoming a better player and improving his battle skills and his collection. He tends to be more cautious and less adventurous; preferring to calculate the odds before taking a risk, unless rare Creatures, BattleGear, or Mugics are at stake. Kaz is usually aided by his Underworld friend H'earring who helps him locate desirable scans, usually at the price of some disgusting delicacies. Prior to the series, Kaz frequently told Tom about Chaotic being real, but Tom never believed Kaz until he entered his transport code into his scanner. Kaz's favorite and trademark card is Chaor, the leader of the Underworld.
 Peyton (a.k.a. PeytonicMaster) – Peyton was introduced in the third episode of Chaotic when he won a battle against Tom. Mainly a Mipedian Player, Peyton is portrayed as a charismatic and eccentric Chaotic player. Peyton speaks in slang and has an encyclopedic knowledge of the game. His intense opinions, his appearance, his unorthodox style of battle and the way he expresses himself all lend themselves to comedy. He often tests unusual theories and strategies in battle, which, shockingly, lead to victory more often than not. He is also perfectly happy to show off cool new scans to his friends. Though he loves to win—especially with his Mipedian Creatures—Peyton will also battle using some of Perim's freakiest Creatures, just to have the experience of transforming into them and "feeling their vibes." While most Chaotic Players think that one tribe is better than the others, Peyton knows how to "look past the personalities and find the powers", though when he isn't testing out different creatures he prefers his Mipedian decks.
 Sarah (a.k.a. ChaotiKween) – Sarah was introduced in the second episode of Chaotic when Tom was tricked into visiting lake Ken-I-Po within Perim. Mainly a Danian player, Sarah is the smart, feisty female of the group with intentions of speaking her mind. A fearless and shrewd Chaotic player, she is often in situations of stumbling into a fight with the boys and/or the other Players. On a few occasions, Sarah is shown to have enough courage when confronting a Creature who gets her angry and is often at the event of leading Tom, Peyton or Kaz to drag her out of danger. She is also known to be a hardcore Scanner, she will camp out for weeks just to get a rare scan. She is also very protective of the boys and is willing do anything to help them. Sarah is shown to have a close relationship with Tom. This is likely due to the fact that she was the first person he met in Perim and her introductory into the main character group.
 Krystella and Klaybourne (a.k.a. Klayotic) – Krystella and Klay are a crafty team of pranksters who function as the main antagonists of the series. They met briefly after the series began. They are almost always together. The duo's favorite activity, besides battling in Chaotic, is sabotaging the lead characters. The duo are also known for doing anything to get scans, including striking deals with known evil Creatures even if the consequences mean trouble for others later. Klay is also known for attempting to scam new players out of their cards. Krystella and Klay are snobbish, conceited, rude and patronizing, and do anything to win, even listening in on players strategizing before their matches, though they stop just short of actual cheating. Klay is seen to have preferred using Lord Van Bloot over all his other cards.

Principal voice actors 
 Darren Dunstan – Kaz Kalinkas, Wamma, Ghatup
 Jason Griffith – Tom Majors, Frafdo, Zhade
 Gary Mack – Klay, Iparu
 Rebecca Soler – Sarah
 Marc Thompson – Peyton, Chaor, Najarin, H'Earring
 Meredith Zeitlin – Krystella

Other voice actors 
Mike Pollock – Tianne, Heptadd
Dan Green – Codemaster Imthor, Tangath Toborn, Tartarek
Marc Diraison – Codemaster Crellan
Sean Schemmel – Maxxor, Ulmar, Blazer, Marquis Darini
David Brimmer – Vidav
David Zen Mansley – Lord Van Bloot, Rhaden
Kevin Kolack – Khybon, additional voices
Eva Christensen – Takinom
Christopher C. Adams
Maddie Blaustein
Joshua Briggs
Greg Abbey – Sobtjek
Shawn Curran
Wayne Grayson
Britton Herring
Rebecca Honig
Jesse Hooker
Matt Hoverman
Allyson Johnson
David Lapkin
Rachael Lillis – Intress, Deehna
Corey Manuel
Cassandra Lee Morris
Suzy Myers
Lisa Ortiz
Ted Lewis
Andrew Rannells
Tony Salerno
Michael Sinterniklaas
Eric Stuart
McNeil Taylor
Veronica Taylor – Quadore, Ajara, Skithia
Tom Wayland
David Wills – Raznus
Brian Wilson
Max Wortendyke
Stuart Zagnit
Oliver Wyman – Agitos, Odu-Bathax, Tartawrecker

The voice director for the series was Darren Dunstan.

Broadcast 
A short preview was shown on 4Kids TV on September 30, 2006, at 10:30 AM ET. The show officially premiered on October 7 of 
that same year. 4Kids Entertainment plans to "roll out the storyline over seven years", implying there were seven seasons planned for the television series. A second season, called Chaotic: M'arillian Invasion, began airing in September 2008 on 4Kids TV. While season 1 used flash animation, seasons two and three were animated in traditional animation. Jetix (U.S.) bought the cable rights to the show and began airing it daily at 7:00 AM on October 1, 2007.

Digital cable providers, such as Comcast, Cox Communications and Bresnan Communications, began to air four new episodes in February 2008 on 4KidsTV's Video On Demand service.

Teletoon and The CW4Kids aired most of the premiere episodes for their respective countries. The CW4Kids premiere episodes began airing in February 2009 with M'arillian Invasion episode 14, while Teletoon began airing the second season in January 2009. Cartoon Network took over premieres for the final seven M'arrillian Invasion episodes in the U.S. in August 2009, but The CW4Kids regained the premieres when the third series, entitled Secrets of the Lost City, started on October 31, 2009, where the rest of the series would then have its premieres simultaneously on both Cartoon Network and The CW4Kids. Toon Disney aired the show on Jetix. On February 13, 2009, Jetix, along with Toon Disney, merged into a new network called Disney XD. The Jetix brand no longer exists in the United States, but the first season of Chaotic continued to air on the network. Cartoon Network acquired the rights for the second and third seasons and began airing them and Yu-Gi-Oh! 5D's in June 2009. By airing the second season straight through, The CW was able to premiere episodes before The CW4Kids. The series finale aired on March 13, 2010, but the show continued to air on Cartoon Network and Disney XD until 2011.

In 2019, the owner of Chaotic, Bryan Gannon, announced in an interview his plans to revive the television series. The series will not consider to be a reboot, but it will instead pick up where it left off from "Son of the Spiritlands", similar to the Samurai Jack season 5 revival.

The series is currently available on Tubi and Peacock.

Video game 
Chaotic: Shadow Warriors is a 2009 action video game based on the TV series. It was released in North America on November 10, 2009, on the PlayStation 3, Wii, Xbox 360 and Nintendo DS.

References

External links 
 
 Official Chaotic YouTube channel
 Chaotic USA (Redirects to the official Chaotic YouTube channel)

 
2000s American animated television series
2010s American animated television series
2000s American science fiction television series
2010s American science fiction television series
2006 American television series debuts
2010 American television series endings
2000s Canadian animated television series
2010s Canadian animated television series
2000s Canadian science fiction television series
2010s Canadian science fiction television series
2006 Canadian television series debuts
2010 Canadian television series endings
Fox Broadcasting Company original programming
American children's animated action television series
American children's animated adventure television series
American children's animated science fantasy television series
Canadian children's animated action television series
Canadian children's animated adventure television series
Canadian children's animated science fantasy television series
Anime-influenced Western animated television series
CW4Kids original programming
Jetix original programming
Teletoon original programming
Fiction about shapeshifting
Television series about parallel universes
Teen animated television series